The Cow Company is a production company based in Chile created in 2007 by Marcos Alvo and Ronny Majlis.

Since 2013, the company has produced over 10 theater plays with critical acclaim from both audience and critics, referred to in the media as "the company behind the biggest theatrical successes in Chile".

Among the plays produced by The Cow Company are:
 
 "Un Dios Salvaje" (God of Carnage) by Yasmina Reza, directed by Andrés Céspedes.
 "Rojo" (Red) by John Logan, directed by Rodrigo Sepúlveda.
 "Cock" (Cock) by Mike Bartlett, directed by Alvaro Viguera.
 "Venus en Piel" (Venus in Fur) by David Ives, directed by Andrés Céspedes.
 "Le Prenom" (Le Prenom) by Alexandre De La Patellière y Matthieu Delaporte, directed by Pato Pimienta.
 "El Crédito" (El Crèdit) by Jordi Galceran, directed by Javiera Contador.
 "Los Pájaros Cantan en Griego" by Marco Antonio de la Parra, directed by Aliocha de la Sotta.
 "Sunset Limited" (The Sunset Limited) by Cormac McCarthy, directed by Alvaro Viguera (being called by the press as the play you can't miss)
 "Closer" by Patrick Marber, directed by Cristian Campos.

References

Revista Wiken de El Mercurio, 14 de agosto 2015

Theatre production companies